Pogonia is a Lithuanian and Polish coat of arms. It was used by several szlachta families in the times of the medieval Poland and the Polish–Lithuanian Commonwealth.

History
The Pogonia coat of arms was firstly granted by King Władysław II Jagiełło in 1434 to Mikołaj, wójt of Lelów. It's an abatement of the Pogoń Litewska coat of arms and was granted to new members of the szlachta from the Grand Duchy of Lithuania.

Blazon

The knights used to get distinctive badges in fights with enemies. The nobles used their coats of arms on shields, helmets, coats and flags. These badges were inherited from one generation to another.  The knights were proud of the achievements of their ancestors. They didn't change anything in their badges except if they did some offence and were forced to change the heraldic sign on the shield. The oldest son inherited the coat of arms of family in West Europe, and must add some special changes in it. Four versions of coat of arms Pogonia are known in heraldry. They are different in color of shield. One is red, the other gold. In the gold shield there is an armour hand from blue cloud which holds the sword. The same hand with sword rises from the helmet.

The coat of arms is adorned with black bands with gold lining.

Notable bearers

Notable bearers of this coat of arms include:
Korecki Princes
 Samuel Korecki
Pogonowski

External links 
  Pogonia & Pogonia 2nd Coats of Arms, bearers.

See also

 Polish heraldry
 Heraldry
 Coat of arms
 List of Polish nobility coats of arms 
 Pogoń
 Czartoryski coat of arms
 Pogoń Litewska

References

Bibliography 
 Alfred Znamierowski, Paweł Dudziński: Wielka księga heraldyki. Warszawa: Świat Książki, 2008, s. 104–108. .

Pogonia